Ahmet Arı (born 13 January 1989) is a Turkish professional footballer who currently plays as a midfielder for Mardin Fosfatspor. He was a youth international.

Club career
Arı began his career with local club 72 Batmanspor in 2003. He was transferred to Gaziantepspor in 2005, where has played since. He has also spent six months on loan with Gaziantep Büyükşehir Belediyespor, from January to May 2008. He has transferred to Bursaspor in 2011.

On 11 August 2012, he joined Samsunspor on a season-long loan.

References

External links

1989 births
Living people
Sportspeople from Batman, Turkey
Turkish footballers
Turkey B international footballers
Turkey under-21 international footballers
Turkey youth international footballers
Bursaspor footballers
Gaziantepspor footballers
Gaziantep F.K. footballers
Süper Lig players
TFF First League players
Association football midfielders